is a Japanese manga artist, well known for his work including unique and original gambling ideas, deep psychological analyses of characters, and his distinct art style. Yakuza and gambling are recurring themes in his manga. In English-speaking countries, he is best known as the author of Kaiji, a gambling-related manga, and Akagi, a mahjong-related manga. In 1998, he won the Kodansha Manga Award for Gambling Apocalypse: Kaiji. An onomatopoeia, "zawa", meaning an uneasy atmosphere, frequently appears in his comics and is considered his trademark.

Career
Fukumoto was born in the Kanagawa Prefecture, and grew up reading Perman and other shōnen manga as a child, as well as studying karate and kickboxing due to wanting to get stronger. In high school, he went on to study architecture, and in his own words, he was "a dazed student, neither good nor a delinquent." After graduating, Fukumoto got a job as a site foreman at a construction company, but found the work boring and decided to become a manga artist to try and get a big break in life. During this time, when he pitched a kendo manga to Kodansha, he was advised to work as an assistant to gain some experience first. He began working under , who was looking for assistants at the time, and quit the construction company after only three months of employment, with the reasoning that if he worked there long enough and obtained qualifications, he would not be able to quit. Despite being hired as an assistant, he was unable to draw skillfully, and was assigned solely to work odd jobs such as cooking. After about a year and a half, Kazama, who was worried about Fukumoto, told him that he was too rough and that he might be better suited to be a truck driver. As a result, Fukumoto quit his job as an assistant after about a year and a half.

In 1980, he made his debut with Yoroshiku! Junjō Daishō, published in Monthly Shōnen Champion. Since then, his work had not achieved large-scale success for a while, so he worked part-time at places like champon restaurants to earn a living while submitting his entries to Tetsuya Chiba Awards in the meantime. In 1983, his work Wani no Hatsukoi won the Outstanding Newcomer Award at the Tetsuya Chiba Awards. Despite having a good part-time job and earning a good amount of money, he chose to make do with manga alone, and quit at 24 years old.

During his debut, he mainly drew human drama stories, but in the 1980s, the Japanese economy was booming and gambling-themed manga was thriving, so he began drawing gambling manga because it was easier to get work in that field. At the end of the 1980s, his mahjong gambling manga Ten began serialization in Kindai Mahjong Gold. It became Fukumoto's first popular work and established him as a well-known manga artist.

In 1996, Fukumoto began serializing Kaiji in Weekly Young Magazine. The series has become a hit, publishing over 70 volumes and selling over 20 million copies, sealing his popularity as a manga artist.

Fukumoto donated 30 million yen to the areas affected by the Great East Japan Earthquake that occurred on March 11, 2011, and has contributed a supportive illustration. He has also visited the affected areas to sign and draw illustrations for the victims. In recent years, he has been involved in making cameo appearances in live-action adaptations of his work, and writing screenplays for the second and third Kaiji films.

Style
Fukumoto is known as one of the leading gambling manga authors, and his work is defined by detailed psychological descriptions and intense characterizations. Much of his works depict men in extreme games, which range from modifications of existing games to original ones altogether. The number of female characters in his gambling-focused works is extremely low, although they do appear quite commonly in works that mainly deal with human nature. Later, however, he began Yami-Mahjong Fighter: Mamiya, a gambling-focused series with a female protagonist.

When drawing, he has a unique penning method of spinning the manuscript paper as he draws. In July 2009, he appeared at the "Big Comic Superior Presents: The 6th "Rieko Saibara's Life Drawing Skill Showdown"" event held at Loft Plus One in Shinjuku, Tokyo, where he drew an illustration of Kaiji in his unique way in front of a large audience and astounded other performers such as Saibara and Hisashi Eguchi.

His favorite gambling activities include mahjong and sic bo, among others. His least favorite is horse racing. He has been playing mahjong since junior high school days, and admitted that though he has rarely lost a game when he was in school, his current level of ability is average. According to him, he has "tournament luck" and has even won mahjong tournaments between mahjong manga artists. He has also participated in professional mahjong matches. He played about two games against Akagi and Kaiji's voice actor Masato Hagiwara, who is known as one of the best mahjong players in the entertainment industry, and made Hagiwara say "I don't think I can beat him."

Works

 (1977) - Maiden work
 (1980, Monthly Shōnen Champion) - Debut
 (1980, Monthly Shōnen Champion)
 (1980, Monthly Shōnen Champion) - First serial story
 (1982)
 (1983, Morning)
 (1986, Manga Action)
 (1986-1995, Kindai Mahjong Original)
 (1987-1988, Tokusen Mahjong)
 (1989–2002, Kindai Mahjong Gold)
 (1990, Gekiga Mahjong Jidai)
 (1990, Weekly Shōnen Magazine)
 (1990–1991, Keiba Gold)
 (1991–2018, Kindai Mahjong)
 (1992–1996, Action Pizazz)
 (1996, Weekly Manga Sunday)
 (1996–1999, Weekly Young Magazine)
 (2000–2004, Weekly Young Magazine)
 (2004–2007, Weekly Young Magazine)
 (2009–2012, Weekly Young Magazine)
 (2013–2017, Weekly Young Magazine)
 (2017–present, Weekly Young Magazine)
 (1999, Pachinko Jidai)
 (2000-2001, Weekly Shōnen Magazine)
 (2002–2006, Big Comic Original)
 (2013–2020, Big Comic Original)
 (2007–2009, Weekly Shōnen Magazine)
 (2011–2013, Weekly Shōnen Magazine)
 (2019–present, Kindai Mahjong)

As writer
 (1998, Young Magazine Uppers) — Illustrated by Kaiji Kawaguchi
 (1999, Young Magazine Uppers) — Illustrated by Kaiji Kawaguchi
 (2011, theatrical film) — Screenplay
 (2020, theatrical film) — Original story, screenplay

As supervisor
 (2008–2012, Kindai Mahjong Original) - Written by Keiichirō Hara, spin-off of Akagi
 (2012–2014, Kindai Mahjong Original → Kindai Manga) - Written by Keiichirō Hara
 (2009–2021, Kindai Mahjong) - Written by Jirō Maeda, spin-off of Ten
 (2015–2020, Monthly Young Magazine → Comic Days) - Written by Tensei Hagiwara, illustrated by Tomohiro Hashimoto and Tomoki Miyoshi, spin-off of Kaiji
 (2017–present, Weekly Young Magazine) - Written by Tensei Hagiwara, illustrated by Motomu Uehara and Kazuya Arai, spin-off of Kaiji
 (2017–present, Yawaraka Spirits) - Written by Kenji Yokoi, illustrated by Motomu Uehara and Kazuya Arai, spin-off of The Legend of the Strongest, Kurosawa!
 (2021–present, Morning) - Written by Tensei Hagiwara, illustrated by Tomoki Miyoshi and Yoshiaki Seto, spin-off of Kaiji

TV/Movie appearances
 (2009, theatrical film)
 (2011, theatrical film)
 (2017, TV Tokyo) - Episodes 9, 10
 (2017, SKY PerfecTV!) - Episode 2
 (2018, Nippon Television) - Episode 7
 (2018, TV Tokyo) - Episode 5
 (2020, theatrical film)

Miscellaneous
 (2011, Takeshobo)
 (2014, Government Public Relations Online)
 (2015) - End card (ep 4)
 (2017) - End card (ep 9)

References

External links 
 

 
1958 births
Living people
Manga artists from Kanagawa Prefecture
People from Yokosuka, Kanagawa
Winner of Kodansha Manga Award (General)